Valluy is a surname. Notable people with the surname include:

 , Governor of Dahomey from 1949 to 1951
 Jean Etienne Valluy (1899–1970), French general and historian 

French-language surnames